The Small Arms Survey (SAS) is an independent research project located at the Graduate Institute of International and Development Studies in Geneva, Switzerland. It provides information on all aspects of small arms and armed violence, as a resource for governments, policy-makers, researchers, and activists, as well as research on small arms issues.

The survey monitors national and international initiatives (governmental and non-governmental), and acts as a forum and clearinghouse for the sharing of information. It also disseminates best practice measures and initiatives dealing with small arms issues.

SAS's mandate is to look at all aspects of small arms and armed violence. It provides research and analysis by which to support governments to reduce the incidence of armed violence and illicit trafficking through evidence-based analysis.

The project's staff includes international experts in security studies, political science, law, international public policy, development studies, economics, conflict resolution, and sociology. The staff works closely with a worldwide network of researchers and partners.

History 
The Small Arms Survey was established in 1999 «on the initiative» of Switzerland's Federal Department of Foreign Affairs (FDFA) and «in conjunction with other interested governments». They placed the project under the tutelage of the Graduate Institute of International and Development Studies (IHEID). In July 1999, Keith Krause (born 1960) became the founder and programme director. The Canadian political scientist, who wrote his PhD thesis at Oxford University on the issue of international arms transfers and has been a professor of international politics at the IHEID since 1994, remained in that position until December 2015.

Focus projects
The Small Arms Survey hosts the Geneva Declaration on Armed Violence and Development Secretariat.
The Small Arms Survey's Human Security Baseline Assessment for Sudan and South Sudan project supports violence reduction initiatives, including disarmament, demobilization, and reintegration programmes, incentive schemes for civilian arms collections and security sector reform, and arms control interventions across Sudan.
The Security Assessment in North Africa project supports efforts to build a more secure environment in North Africa and the Sahel-Sahara region. The project produces evidence-based research and analysis on the availability and circulation of small arms, the dynamics of emerging armed groups, and related insecurity. The research stresses the effects of the recent uprisings and armed conflicts in the region on community safety.

2018 report 
In 2018, Small Arms Survey reported that there are over one billion small arms distributed globally, of which 857 million (about 85 percent) are in civilian hands. U.S. civilians alone account for 393 million (about 46 percent) of the worldwide total of civilian held firearms. This amounts to "120.5 firearms for every 100 residents."

According to the report, the world's armed forces control about 133 million (about 13 percent) of the global total of small arms, of which over 43 percent belong to two countries: the Russian Federation (30.3 million) and China (27.5 million). And, the world's law enforcement agencies control about 23 million (about 2 percent) of the global total of small arms.

Global distribution of firearms

American gun ownership 

American civilians own over 393 million guns. "Americans made up 4 percent of the world's population but owned about 46 percent of the entire global stock of 857 million civilian firearms." That is three times as many guns as the combined stockpile of the world's armed forces. American civilians own more guns "than those held by civilians in the other top 25 countries combined."

"American civilians own nearly 100 times as many firearms as the U.S. military and nearly 400 times as many as law enforcement." Americans bought more than 2 million guns in May 2018 alone. That is more than twice as many guns, as possessed by every law enforcement agency in the United States put together. In April and May 2018, Americans bought 4.7 million guns, which is more than all the firearms stockpiled by the United States military. In 2017, Americans bought 25.2 million guns, 2.5 million more guns than possessed by every law enforcement agency in the world put together. Between 2012 and 2017, Americans bought 135 million guns, that's 2 million more guns than the combined stockpile of all the world's armed forces.

Reception 
The Small Arms Survey's reports are widely used and considered to be accurate, though all of the figures involve "some degree of estimation", and estimates for certain countries are highly uncertain.

In response to a report about the number of firearms in Finland, the Finnish Ministry of the Interior issued a statement saying that the number was inflated and completely wrong.

Publications
The project's flagship publication is the Small Arms Survey, an annual review of global small arms issues such as production, stockpiles, brokering, legal and illicit arms transfers, the effects of small arms, and national, bilateral, and multilateral measures to deal with the problems associated with small arms. Published by Cambridge University Press, it is recognized as the principal international source of impartial and reliable information on all aspects of small arms. It is widely used by policy-makers, government officials and non-governmental organizations.
 The Small Arms Survey 2007, titled Guns in the City.
The Small Arms Survey 2009, titled Shadows of War.
The Small Arms Survey 2010, titled Gangs, Groups, and Guns.
The Small Arms Survey 2011, titled States of Security.
The Small Arms Survey 2012, titled Moving Targets
The Small Arms Survey 2013, titled Everyday Dangers
The Small Arms Survey 2014, titled Women and Guns.
The Small Arms Survey 2015, titled Weapons and the World.
The Small Arms Survey 2018, titled Small Arms Survey reveals: More than one billion firearms in the world.  
The Small Arms Survey 2018, titled Estimating Global Civilian Held Firearms Numbers.
The Small Arms Survey 2018, titled Estimating Global Military Owned Firearms Numbers.
The Small Arms Survey 2018, titled Estimating Global Law Enforcement Firearms Numbers.

In addition to its annual yearbook, the Small Arms Survey publishes a wide range of periodical research findings. These include a Book Series, Occasional Papers, Special Reports, Working Papers, and short Issue Briefs and Research Notes. These publications present substantial research findings on data, methodological, and conceptual issues related to small arms or detailed country and regional case studies. Most of these are published in hard copy and are also accessible on the project's web site.

See also
 Conflict Armament Research
 Gun ownership
 Gun politics
 Insecurity Insight
 Small arms
 Small arms proliferation

References

External links
 Official website

Graduate Institute of International and Development Studies
Arms control
Firearms
Gun politics
Think tanks based in Switzerland
Organisations based in Geneva